Tari Airport is an airport in Tari, Papua New Guinea .

Airlines and destinations

Airports in Papua New Guinea
Southern Highlands Province